So'otala Fa'aso'o (born 2 October 1994) is a New Zealand-born, Samoan rugby union player who currently plays as a loose forward for London Irish in the Premiership Rugby.

Senior career

Fa'aso'o has had something of a nomadic career which started in 2013 with his local province, Auckland.   He made 2 appearances for them before shifting south the following season to join Manawatu.   He didn't manage to make the field for them so was forced to drop down to New Zealand's Heartland Championship with Wairarapa Bush in 2015.   Solid performances there saw him earn another shot at Mitre 10 Cup rugby with the Pukekohe-based Counties Manukau in 2016 where he played all 11 games as the Steelers reached the Premiership Semi-Finals before going down to eventual winners .

His appearances in New Zealand brought him to the attention of French-side Racing 92 who announced in November 2016 that they had signed Fa'aso'o on a contract until the end of the 2016–17 Top 14 season.

On 4 July 2022, Fa'aso'o would move to England to join London Irish in the Premiership Rugby from the 2022-23 season.

International career 

Fa'aso'o was a member of the Samoa Under 20 side which competed in the 2014 IRB Junior World Championship in New Zealand, making 3 appearances and scoring 1 try.

References

1994 births
Living people
New Zealand rugby union players
Rugby union players from Auckland
Rugby union number eights
Auckland rugby union players
Counties Manukau rugby union players
Racing 92 players
CA Brive players
New Zealand sportspeople of Samoan descent
Expatriate rugby union players in France
Wairarapa Bush rugby union players